Viktor Borysovych Maslov (born 31 March 1949 in Petropavlovsk-Kamchatskiy, Kamchatka Oblast) is a former Ukrainian footballer and football referee.

References

External links 
 

1949 births
Living people
People from Petropavlovsk-Kamchatsky
Soviet footballers
Ukrainian footballers
Ukrainian football referees
FC Vorskla Poltava players
FC Chornomorets Odesa players
FC Dnipro players
FC Dynamo Kyiv players
FC Elektrometalurh-NZF Nikopol players
Soviet Top League players
Soviet football managers
Ukrainian football managers
FC Krystal Kherson managers
FC Vorskla Poltava managers
FC Torpedo Zaporizhzhia managers
FC Dnipro-2 Dnipropetrovsk managers
FC Stal Kamianske managers
Association football midfielders